The 1999 Halloween Havoc  was the 11th annual Halloween Havoc professional wrestling pay-per-view (PPV) event produced by World Championship Wrestling (WCW). It took place on October 24, 1999, from the MGM Grand Garden Arena in the Las Vegas suburb of Paradise, Nevada for the fourth consecutive year. In 2014, all of WCW's Halloween Havoc PPVs became available on WWE's streaming service, the WWE Network.

Production

Background
Halloween Havoc was an annual professional wrestling pay-per-view event produced by World Championship Wrestling (WCW) since 1989. As the name implies, it was a Halloween-themed show held in October. The 1999 event was the 11th event in the Halloween Havoc chronology and it took place on October 24, 1999, from the MGM Grand Garden Arena in the Las Vegas suburb of Paradise, Nevada for the fourth consecutive year.

Storylines
The event featured professional wrestling matches that involve different wrestlers from pre-existing scripted feuds and storylines. Professional wrestlers portray villains, heroes, or less distinguishable characters in the scripted events that build tension and culminate in a wrestling match or series of matches.

Event

The opening match saw Disco Inferno retain the WCW Cruiserweight Championship in a match against Lash LeRoux. Inferno was able to hit an inverted atomic drop followed by the Last Dance, to pick up the victory via pinfall.

The second match was a Street Fight for the vacant WCW World Tag Team Championship between Harlem Heat (Booker T and Stevie Ray), The Filthy Animals (Billy Kidman and Konnan), and The First Family (Brian Knobbs and Hugh Morrus).  After Harlem Heat and The First Family took the fight to the back of the arena, Booker T pinned Knobbs. Whole the ref that followed them lead them back to the ring to make the official decision, Kidman pinned Morrus. The two referees conferred and it was ultimately determined to award the victory to Harlem Heat.

The next match saw Eddy Guerrero defeat Perry Saturn by disqualification. Perry Saturn was disqualified after Ric Flair came out and hit Eddie Guerrero with a crowbar. Kidman along with Torrie Wilson came out to make the save, however Flair kissed Wilson who although at first was shocked appeared to enjoy it.

The following match saw Brad Armstrong defeating Berlyn. Next, Rick Steiner won the WCW World Television Championship with a victory over Chris Benoit after Dean Malenko attacked Benoit with a chair. Following this, Lex Luger picked up a submission victory over Bret Hart after applying a half crab.

The following match was supposed to be Sting and Hulk Hogan for the WCW World Heavyweight Championship. Hogan’s music played however he never entered. Eventually Sting’s music played and he made his way to the ring. Following this Hogan’s music played again and he entered wearing street clothing. Upon entering the ring, Hogan whispered in Sting’s ear and then lay down. Sting covered Hogan and the match ended with the opening bell never having rung.

The next match was for the WCW United States Heavyweight Championship. On his way to the ring, the challenger, Goldberg was attacked by Scott Hall and Kevin Nash. Despite this, Goldberg was still able to capture the championship from Sid Vicious. With Vicious covered in blood and unable to answer the referee, Mickie Henson's count, the referee was forced to stop the match and award the victory and the title to Goldberg.

The second to last match was a strap match between Diamond Dallas Page and  Ric Flair. Page was able to gain the victory, with the strap wrapped around Flair’s neck.

The final match of the night was WCW World Heavyweight Champion Sting wrestled WCW United States Champion Goldberg. Although the announcers stated this match was a non-title match, following the match Goldberg was announced as the new WCW World Champion. After Sting argued with the referee Charles Robinson, before Sting hit the Scorpion Death Drop on Robinson immediately.

Reception
In 2017, Kevin Pantoja of 411Mania gave the event a rating of 1.5 [Extremely Horrendous], stating, "There is almost nothing redeemable about this event. It truly sucks. Russo’s crash TV style was all over this, but even without those strange moments, the wrestling wasn’t any good. Sid/Goldberg was the match of the night, so you know there’s a problem. There were things like the stupid Sting/Hogan trash and the confusing main event. Guys like Eddie Guerrero phoned it in, while someone like Chris Benoit was dragged down by the horrible Rick Steiner. Tons of nonsense throughout a show filled with lame matches."

Aftermath
The following night on Nitro, Sting declared that he has never agreed to defend the title and called J. J. Dillon to the ring to explain. Dillon announced the title was being vacated due to Sting's attack on referee Charles Robinson during the unsanctioned match and announced a tournament for the vacant title to conclude at the following month's Mayhem pay-per-view event. Later that night, Goldberg defends his WCW United States Heavyweight Championship match against and lost to Bret Hart, after Kevin Nash, Scott Hall and Sid Vicious attacked and cost Goldberg for the U.S. Heavyweight Championship match.

Results

References

Holidays themed professional wrestling events
Professional wrestling shows in the Las Vegas Valley
Events in Paradise, Nevada
1999 in Nevada
Halloween Havoc
October 1999 events in the United States
1999 World Championship Wrestling pay-per-view events